Sounds Like a Revolution is a 2010 Canadian documentary film about recent protest music in the United States. Directed by Summer Love and Jane Michener, the film premiered on June 16, 2010 in Toronto.

Focusing on the personal experiences of four independent musicians, the film portrays Michael Franti, Fat Mike, Paris and Anti-Flag and a collection of live performances, political rallies, music videos and uncensored commentaries from Pete Seeger, the Dixie Chicks, David Crosby, Steve Earle, Jello Biafra, Ani DiFranco, Wayne Kramer, Tom Morello and more.

Cast
Jello Biafra
Rob Bowman 
David Crosby
Alan Cross
Davey D
Ani DiFranco
Steve Earle
Michael Franti
Ice-T
Al Jourgensen
Fat Mike
Tom Morello
Natalie Pa'apa'a
Paris
Jackie Richardson
Boots Riley
Henry Rollins
Justin Sane
Pete Seeger
Spearhead

Music
The documentary features songs from Anti-Flag, NOFX, Paris, Michael Franti & Spearhead, Blue King Brown and The Disposable Heroes of Hiphoprisy. Also additional songs are included from the Dixie Chicks, Ministry, Body Count, Johnny Dix and The Coup.

References

External links
 
 
 Review in the Globe and Mail
 Review in CBC News

2010 films
2010 documentary films
Canadian documentary films
Documentary films about music and musicians
Documentary films about the United States
2010s English-language films
2010s Canadian films